The 1987 East Carolina Pirates football team was an American football team that represented East Carolina University as an independent during the 1987 NCAA Division I-A football season. In their third season under head coach Art Baker, the team compiled a 5–6 record.

Schedule

References

East Carolina
East Carolina Pirates football seasons
East Carolina Pirates football